Uspensky, or Uspenskaya (feminine; Успе́нская, Uśpieńska) is an east European surname. Notable people with the surname include:

People 
 Aleksandr Uspensky (1902–1940), Soviet NKVD officer
 Andrej Uspenski, Russian photographer
 Boris Uspensky (born 1937), Russian philologist and historian
 Eduard Uspensky (1937–2018), Russian writer
 Fyodor Uspensky (1845–1928), Russian Byzantinist
 Gleb Uspensky (1843–1902), Russian writer
 J. V. Uspensky (1883–1947), Stanford University mathematician
 Lev Uspensky (1900–1978), Soviet writer
 Lyubov Uspenskaya (born 1954), popular Ukrainian/Russian chanson singer
 Maria Ouspenskaya (1876–1949), Russian actress and acting teacher
 Marina Uspenskaya (1925–2007), Russian book designer and graphics painter
 Nikolai Uspensky (1837–1889), Russian writer
 Nikolay Nikolayevich Uspensky, Russian diplomat, former ambassador to Estonia
 Peter Uspensky (1878–1947), Russian esotericist and philosopher, known as P. D. Ouspensky
 Porphyrius Uspensky (1804–1885), Russian traveller and theologian
 Vladimir Andreyevich Uspensky (born 1930), Soviet/Russian mathematician